Gary Turco (born May 30, 1981) is an American politician who has served in the Connecticut House of Representatives from the 27th district since 2019.

References

1981 births
Living people
Democratic Party members of the Connecticut House of Representatives
21st-century American politicians